"Clubhopping" is a song by Swedish electronic dance music duo Rob'n'Raz, featuring American singer Lutricia McNeal and rapper D-Flex. Released in 1993 as the lead single from their second album, Clubhopping (The Album) (1992), it achieved some success in Europe. It was a top 10 hit in both the Netherlands and Finland, peaking at number nine and ten. In the duo's native Sweden, it charted in the top 20, reaching number thirteen.

Critical reception
A reviewer from Music & Media commented, "Hopping from club to club and from station to station, this bouncy tune will be omnipresent. A bit reminiscent of Incognito's "Always There", which probably explains why there's no escaping." In 1994, the magazine's Robbert Tilli wrote, "In the Asterix cartoons, all villagers put parsley in their ears when the dreadful bard starts singing. Sometimes it seems like radio programmers do the same when a really good dance song comes along. One of the biggest misses last year was Rob 'N' Raz's sing-along groover "Clubhopping", which deserved a better destiny than the stations' riling cabinets."

Track listing
 7" single, Sweden (1992)
"Clubhopping" (Radio Version) – 3:19
"Clubhopping" (Instrumental Version) – 3:19

 12" single, Germany (1993)
"Clubhopping" (Extended Version) – 5:49
"Clubhopping" (Radio Edit) – 3:33
"Clubhopping" (Legacy of Sound Remix) – 5:17
"Clubhopping" (Rob 'N' Raz Strictly Dub) – 7:40                   

 CD maxi, Europe (1993)
"Clubhopping" (Radio Edit) – 3:33
"Clubhopping" (Legacy of Sound Radioremix) – 4:17
"Clubhopping" (Legacy of Sound Remix) – 5:17
"Clubhopping" (Extended Version) – 5:49

Charts

Weekly charts

Year-end charts

References

 

1993 singles
1993 songs
Swedish dance songs
English-language Swedish songs
Eurodance songs
House music songs
Rob'n'Raz songs
Warner Music Group singles